Brian Allen McCall (born January 25, 1943) is an American former professional baseball player, an outfielder who appeared in seven Major League Baseball games for the Chicago White Sox in –.

McCall registered only three hits in 15 at bats during his big league trials — all of the hits coming during the closing weekend of the 1962 regular season against the American League and eventual World Series champion New York Yankees at Yankee Stadium. On Friday, September 28, the 19-year-old McCall hit a pinch single off Tex Clevenger in the ninth inning of a 7–3 loss. Then, on Sunday, McCall started in center field and hit two home runs (off Bill Stafford and Ralph Terry) in five at-bats, knocking in three runs — the only runs batted in of his Major League career — as the White Sox triumphed, 8–4. McCall's professional career extended from 1961 to 1966.

After retiring from baseball McCall has become a 3-D artist.

References

External links

1943 births
Living people
Baseball players from Long Beach, California
Charlotte Hornets (baseball) players
Chicago White Sox players
Evansville White Sox players
Florida Instructional League White Sox players
Greensboro Yankees players
Idaho Falls Russets players
Long Beach Polytechnic High School alumni
Lynchburg White Sox players
Major League Baseball outfielders
Montgomery Rebels players
People from Kentfield, California
Savannah White Sox players
Tri-City Braves players